"ASAP Forever" is a song by American rapper ASAP Rocky, released on April 5, 2018 as the lead single for his third studio album Testing (2018). The song contains a sample of "Porcelain" by American musician Moby, who is credited as a featured artist. The song also features background vocals by singer Khloe Anna and production from Hector Delgado, Rocky (under the pseudonym Lord Flacko), and Jordie X.

Background and composition 
In December 2017, ASAP Rocky previewed the song on Instagram; it was originally titled "Gang". Shortly after the track was released on April 5, 2018, Rocky debuted it live on The Tonight Show Starring Jimmy Fallon. The song details Rocky's loyalty to the ASAP Mob and his life, such as his interest in Dominican Republic cuisine. Rocky also mentions that he and his partner "kiss to Frank Ocean and Blonde", shouts out to Margiela and Goyard, and uses multiple fashion puns.

Music video 
The music video was directed by Dexter Navy and released on April 5, 2018. It starts with ASAP Rocky and his ASAP Mob collective in New York City, then shifts into different scenes as Rocky raps the first verse. In the ending, he falls into an abyss and is wearing a belt with the word "TESTING" on it.

Remix 

The song was officially remixed featuring vocals from fellow American rappers T.I. and Kid Cudi. T.I. provided the intro for the song, while Cudi contributed a guest verse. The remix appears as the second track on ASAP Rocky's third album Testing.

Charts

Certifications

References 

2018 singles
2018 songs
ASAP Rocky songs
Moby songs
Songs written by ASAP Rocky
Songs written by Moby
RCA Records singles
Sony Music singles